Castro Barbosa (1905-1975) was a Brazilian actor and singer. His song, O Teu Cabelo Nao Nega, Mulata!, became a hit in Brazil in 1932.

References

External links

1905 births
1975 deaths
20th-century Brazilian male singers
20th-century Brazilian singers